Stakeout is a 1987 American buddy cop action comedy film directed by John Badham and starring Richard Dreyfuss, Emilio Estevez, Madeleine Stowe and Aidan Quinn. The screenplay was written by Jim Kouf, who won a 1988 Edgar Award for his work. Although the story is set in Seattle, the film was shot in Vancouver. A sequel, Another Stakeout, followed in 1993.

The film later inspired the 1989 Malayalam-language movie Vandanam and 1991 Telugu-language movie Nirnayam.

Plot

Detectives Chris Lecce and Bill Reimers are assigned to the night shift on a stakeout of Latina waitress Maria McGuire. Her former boyfriend, Richard "Stick" Montgomery, has escaped from prison following a staged brawl with his cellmate with help from his cousin, Caylor Reese, who escaped with him in a truck.

The FBI asks for cooperation from Lecce and Reimers in capturing Montgomery. They believe he may return to an old girlfriend, Maria McGuire, who lives in Seattle. Meanwhile Lecce is going through a divorce. He comes home and finds out that his wife moved out, taking the furniture and leaving him in despair.

Montgomery telephones Maria but the line gets cut off so the call cannot be traced. He has a large amount of money he secretly hid in an armchair prior to his incarceration. Lecce and Reimers spy on Maria, hoping Montgomery will turn up at her door so they can arrest him. Lecce pretends to be a telephone lineman, to get close to Maria. He also helps her brother Ray to get a job to stay out of trouble.

Fate takes a turn as Lecce falls in love with Maria and the Seattle police suspect him as being one of Montgomery's allies. While Lecce is asleep in Maria's bed, Montgomery and Reese break into her house, with Montgomery shooting Lecce in the face. Lecce wakes up, however, to find out it was only a nightmare. Realizing he slept in, he must leave the house without being seen. At the police station, Reimers scolds him for sleeping with Maria, and reminds him he is a good cop who made one mistake.

After killing a cashier in a gas station, Montgomery and Reese have a run-in with several officers waiting for them outside Seattle, causing a shootout and their car crashes into the river. Montgomery escapes from the vehicle before it sinks, but Reese is wounded and dies in the sunken car.

Lecce tells his secret to Maria, but she starts to get upset, only to run into Montgomery, who tells Chris and Maria that he stashed half-million dollars in a couch that he bought for her years prior. He was hoping that he and Maria would have a great life together in Canada, but Lecce ruined it.

After capturing Reimers, Montgomery plans to murder both cops. The climax of the film takes place at a paper mill, where Lecce and Montgomery have a shootout, resulting in Montgomery being shot in the chest. Maria and Lecce start a relationship.

Cast
 Richard Dreyfuss as Detective Chris Lecce
 Emilio Estevez as Detective Bill Reimers
 Aidan Quinn as Richard "Stick" Montgomery
 Madeleine Stowe as Maria McGuire
 Forest Whitaker as Detective Jack Pismo
 Dan Lauria as Detective Phil Coldshank
 Earl Billings as Captain Al Giles
 Ian Tracey as Caylor Reese
 Jackson Davies as FBI Agent Thomas Lusk
 J. J. Makaro as B.C.
 Scott Andersen as Reynaldo McGuire
 Tony Pantages as Tony Harmon
 Beatrice Boepple as Carol Reimers
 Kyle Wodia as Jeffrey Reimers
 Jan Speck as Kelly McDonald
 Kim Kondrashoff as Billy Steeks
 Gary Heatherington as Prison Doctor
 Don S. Davis as Prison Gate Guard
 Blu Mankuma as 2nd Paramedic
 Denny Williams as Farol Bernie

Reception

Critical response 
On Rotten Tomatoes the film holds an approval rating of 89% based on 27 reviews, with an average rating of 6.9/10. The website's critics consensus reads, "Richard Dreyfuss and Emilio Estevez make for great company during this Stakeout, a bawdy procedural that mines great pleasure from the odd couple's comedic chemistry." On Metacritic, the film has a weighted average score of 69 out of 100, based on 14 critics, indicating "generally favorable reviews". Audiences polled by CinemaScore gave the film an average grade of "A−" on an A+ to F scale.

Film critic Roger Ebert gave the film three stars, praising its premise while finding that the humor and the human aspect were surrounded by violent thriller aspects that did not gel as well with the humor, although he highlighted Dreyfuss and his performance.

Box office
The film debuted at number one at the box office. It went on to gross $65.6 million domestically, ranking as the eighth-highest-grossing film of the year.

References

External links

 
 
 
 
 

1987 films
1980s action comedy films
1980s buddy comedy films
1980s crime comedy films
American action comedy films
American buddy comedy films
American buddy cop films
American police detective films
American crime comedy films
Edgar Award-winning works
Films about prison escapes
Films about security and surveillance
Films directed by John Badham
Films scored by Arthur B. Rubinstein
Films set in Seattle
Films set in Washington (state)
Films shot in Vancouver
Touchstone Pictures films
Fictional portrayals of the Seattle Police Department
Films about the Federal Bureau of Investigation
1980s buddy cop films
1987 comedy films
1980s English-language films
1980s American films